
Gmina Bielsk Podlaski  is a rural gmina (Polish:gmina wiejska) in Bielsk County, Podlaskie Voivodeship. It is located in north-eastern Poland.

Geography
The gmina covers an area of

Rivers
Five rivers pass through the Gmina:
 The Narew River, a tributary of the Bug River
 The Strabelka River, a tributary of the Narew River
 The Orlanka River, a tributary of the Narew River
 The Biała River, a tributary of the Orlanka River
 The Łoknica River, a tributary of the Narew River

Demographics
As of 2007 its total population is 7,286.

Municipal Government
Its seat is the town of Bielsk Podlaski, although the town is not part of the territory of the gmina.

Executive Branch
The chief executive of the government is the mayor (Polish: wójt).

Legislative Branch
The legislative portion of the government is the City Council (Polish: Rada), composed of the President (Polish: Przewodniczący), the Vice-President (Polish: Wiceprzewodniczący) and thirteen councilors.

Villages
Abramiki, Augustowo, Bańki, Biała, Bielanowszczyzna, Bolesty, Brześcianka, Chraboły, Deniski, Dobromil, Dubiażyn, Dwór, Gaj, Grabowiec, Haćki, Hendzel, Hołody, Hryniewicze Duże, Hryniewicze Małe, Husaki, Jacewicze, Knorozy, Knorydy, Knorydy Górne, Knorydy Podleśne, Knorydy Średnie, Korpacz, Koszarka, Kotły, Kozły, Kożyno Duże, Kożyno Małe, Krzywa, Lewki, Łoknica, Łubin Kościelny, Łubin Rudołty, Malinowo, Miękisze, Mokre, Na Brańskiej, Nałogi, Ogrodniki, Orlanka, Orzechowicze, Parcewo, Pasynki, Pietrzykowo-Gołąbki, Pietrzykowo-Wyszki, Piliki, Pilipki, Ploski, Plutycze, Podbiele, Proniewicze, Rajki, Rajsk, Rzepniewo, Saki, Sierakowizna, Skrzypki Duże, Skrzypki Małe, Sobotczyzna, Sobótka, Stołowacz, Stryki, Stupniki, Szastały, Szewele, Treszczotki, Truski, Użyki, Widowo, Woronie, Zawady, Zubowo.

Neighbouring Municipalities
Gmina Bielsk Podlaski is bordered by the town of Bielsk Podlaski and by the gminas of Boćki, Brańsk, Czyże, Juchnowiec Kościelny, Narew, Orla, Wyszki and Zabłudów.

References
Polish official population figures 2006

Bielsk Podlaski
Bielsk County